Gianni Mattioli (1903 – 1977) was an Italian businessman, a cotton trader in Milan, and art collector, particularly of the work of the Italian Futurists.

Mattioli was born in Milan in 1903, and started collecting in the early 1920s, but most of his collection was built in the late 1930s and 1940s, and in 1949, he acquired 87 works from fellow Italian collector Pietro Feroldi (1881–1958).

Mattioli died in Milan in 1977, and his daughter the art historian, Laura Mattioli Rossi, inherited the collection.

26 works from the Gianni Mattioli Collection have been on loan to the Peggy Guggenheim Collection in Venice from 1997 to 2015.

In November 2015, Nu couché a 1917 Amedeo Modigliani oil on canvas from the collection, was sold by his daughter at Christie's, New York for $170.4 million to Liu Yiqian.

References

1903 births
1977 deaths
Italian art collectors
20th-century Italian businesspeople
Italian political party founders